Gilreath is the surname of the following people:
David Gilreath (born 1988), American football wide receiver 
Erin Gilreath (born 1980), American hammer thrower
George Allen Gilreath (1834–1863), American military commander
James Gilreath (1936–2003), American pop singer and songwriter